Banca San Paolo di Brescia was an Italian bank based in Brescia, Lombardy. The owner of Banca San Paolo di Brescia and Credito Agrario Bresciano formed a new holding company Banca Lombarda in 1998, as well as merging the two banks into Banco di Brescia on 1 January 1999.

History
Banca San Paolo di Brescia was found in 1888 in Brescia. One of the main founder, Giuseppe Tovini, also participated in the foundation of Banca di Valle Camonica (1872) and Banco Ambrosiano (1896). St. Paul Bank of Brescia acquired Banca di Valle Camonica in 1963.

References

External links

 Fondazione Banca San Paolo di Brescia 

Banks established in 1888
Italian companies established in 1888
Banks disestablished in 1998
Italian companies disestablished in 1998
Defunct banks of Italy
Companies based in Brescia
History of UBI Banca